Dimitar Nakov (born 18 October 1980) is a Bulgarian footballer. He currently plays as a midfield maestro for JB Rangers FC.

Career
Nakov was raised in Belasitsa Petrich's youth teams. Nakov moved to Slavia Sofia at age 21. On 21 August 2007, he signed a 2-year contract with PFC Pirin Blagoevgrad. In 2018 Nakov made the monstrous move by signing for JB Rangers under impressive manager Robb Sheridan (The Sunday League Pep Guardiola) on a 5 year deal.

References

1980 births
Living people
Bulgarian footballers
PFC Belasitsa Petrich players
PFC Slavia Sofia players
PFC Rodopa Smolyan players
PFC Pirin Blagoevgrad players
FC Irtysh Pavlodar players
FC Sportist Svoge players
FC Montana players
OFC Pirin Blagoevgrad players
Atromitos Yeroskipou players
PFC Vidima-Rakovski Sevlievo players
FC Pirin Razlog players
First Professional Football League (Bulgaria) players
Bulgarian expatriate sportspeople in Kazakhstan
Expatriate footballers in Kazakhstan
Expatriate footballers in Cyprus
Association football defenders
People from Petrich
Sportspeople from Blagoevgrad Province